Hubert Lewis may refer to:

 Bertie Lewis (1920–2010), World War II RAF airman and peace campaigner
 Hubert William Lewis (1896–1977), Welsh recipient of the Victoria Cross

See also
Bert Lewis (disambiguation)